Gorenstein may refer to:

 Daniel Gorenstein (1923–1992), American mathematician, known for
Alperin–Brauer–Gorenstein theorem
Gorenstein–Harada theorem
Gorenstein ring
Gorenstein scheme
Gorenstein–Walter theorem
 Eli Gorenstein (born 1952), Israeli actor, voice actor, singer and cellist
 Friedrich Gorenstein (1932–2002), Russian author and screenwriter
Hilda Goldblatt Gorenstein (Hilgos) (1905–1998), artist and inspiration for the documentary I Remember Better When I Paint
 Mark Gorenstein (born 1946), Russian conductor

Horenstein may refer to:
 Irving Howe (born Horenstein; 1920–1993). Jewish American literary and social critic
 Jascha Horenstein (1898–1973), Ukrainian-born American conductor

See also
Hornstein (surname)